Tina Rasmussen (born 14 April 1980) is a Danish retired Forward who played for IK Skovbakken and the Danish national team.

International career
Rasmussen was also part of the Danish team at the 2009 European Championships.

References

1980 births
VSK Aarhus (women) players
Danish women's footballers
Denmark women's international footballers
Women's association football forwards
Living people